Nikita Lukin (born 17 January 1992) is a Russian professional ice hockey forward currently playing for HC Lada Togliatti of the Supreme Hockey League.

Lukin played twelve games with HC Dynamo Moscow of the Kontinental Hockey League (KHL) during the 2012–13 season.

References

External links

1992 births
Living people
Dizel Penza players
Dynamo Balashikha players
HC Dynamo Moscow players
HC MVD players
Molot-Prikamye Perm players
People from Novouralsk
Russian ice hockey forwards
HC Ryazan players
Tsen Tou Jilin City players
Sportspeople from Sverdlovsk Oblast